My Love, My Love is a 1967 French drama film directed by Nadine Trintignant. It was entered into the 1967 Cannes Film Festival.

Cast
 Jean-Louis Trintignant - Vincent Falaise
 Valérie Lagrange - Agathe
 Annie Fargue - Jeanne
 Michel Piccoli - Marrades
 Katarina Larsson - Marilou
 Bernard Fresson - Serge
 Marie Trintignant
 Marie-José Nat - Cameo appearance (uncredited)

References

External links

1967 films
French drama films
1960s French-language films
1967 drama films
Films directed by Nadine Trintignant
1960s French films